Snake Creek is a stream in the U.S. state of South Dakota. It is a tributary of James River.

Snake Creek was so named on account of its frequent meanders.

See also
List of rivers of South Dakota

References

Rivers of Brown County, South Dakota
Rivers of Edmunds County, South Dakota
Rivers of McPherson County, South Dakota
Rivers of Spink County, South Dakota
Rivers of South Dakota